Franco Romero may refer to:

 Franco Romero (footballer, born 1995), Uruguayan right-back
 Franco Romero (footballer, born 2000), Argentine central midfielder